Frances Hyland  (April 25, 1927 – July 11, 2004) was a Canadian stage, film and television actress. She earned recognition for roles on stage (including ten seasons with Stratford Festival) and screen (including her performance as Nanny Louisa on Road to Avonlea). Honoured with the Governor General's Performing Arts Award in 1994, she was called "the first lady of Canadian theatre".

Early life and education
Hyland was born in 1927 in Shaunavon, Saskatchewan, a small town south-west of Swift Current, to Jessie (née Worden), a teacher, and Thomas Hyland, a salesman. She lived there until her parents divorced when she was one year old. She was raised by her mother's family in Ogema, Saskatchewan. When she was seven, she moved to Regina when her parents tried, and failed, to save their marriage. She had no relationship with her father after 1937.  

Her mother put herself through teacher's college to support her daughter's acting career. Hyland's dreams were clouded because her family did not have a great deal of money, thus she was unable to get an adequate education. Nevertheless, she always believed that she could achieve her dreams. 

Hyland graduated in 1948 from the University of Saskatchewan with a BA in English. She earned a scholarship to and graduated from the Royal Academy of Dramatic Art in London. 

Hyland married George McCowan, a fellow Canadian actor and director. They had a son, Evan, in 1957. The couple separated shortly after.

Career 
After graduating from the Royal Academy of Dramatic Art, Hyland made her professional debut in London in 1950, as Stella in A Streetcar Named Desire.

In 1954, she returned to Canada to perform as Isabella in the Stratford Festival production of Shakespeare's Measure for Measure. She became a regular at the festival, performing in ten seasons.  Her roles there included Isabella (in Measure for Measure), Portia (in The Merchant of Venice), Olivia (in Twelfth Night), Perdita (in The Winter's Tale), Desdemona (in Othello) and Ophelia in (in Hamlet). She directed the Stratford Festival's 1979 production of Othello. She also performed with the Shaw Festival and on Broadway (opposite Tony Perkins in Look Homeward, Angel).    

On television, Hyland co-starred on The Albertans and played Nanny Louisa on Road to Avonlea.   

Hyland was considered a "champion" of Canadian actors' campaign for higher status and pay.

Awards and honours 
In 1970, Hyland was appointed an Officer of the Order of Canada. In 1994, Hyland received the Governor General's Performing Arts Award, Canada's highest honour in the performing arts, for her lifetime contribution to Canadian theatre.

Filmography

Movies

Television

References

External links

1927 births
2004 deaths
Canadian film actresses
Canadian stage actresses
Deaths from respiratory failure
Officers of the Order of Canada
People from Shaunavon, Saskatchewan
Actresses from Saskatchewan
University of Saskatchewan alumni
Governor General's Performing Arts Award winners
Canadian Shakespearean actresses